'Arya Vidyapeeth College' (Autonomous) is a liberal science, arts and commerce college located at kamrup Metropolitan district.It is one of the oldest and reputated educational institution in Assam. It was established on 29 July 1958. The college is affiliated to Gauhati University.

Departments

Arts
 Assamese
 Bengali
 Education
 Economics
 English
 Geography
 History
 Philosophy
 Political Science
 Sanskrit

Commerce

Science 
 Anthropology
 Botany
 Chemistry
 Geology
 Mathematics
 Physics
 Statistics
 Zoology

Accreditation
In 2016 the college has been awarded 'A' grade by the National Assessment and Accreditation Council(NAAC). In 2022 University Grants Commission (UGC) grants Arya Vidyapeeth College as Autonomous college.

References

External links
 Official website

Colleges affiliated to Gauhati University
Colleges in Assam
Educational institutions established in 1959
1959 establishments in Assam